The phrase Charlie Brown Christmas Special can refer to one of 4 different works (but usually the first):

A Charlie Brown Christmas (1965)
It's Christmastime Again, Charlie Brown (1992)
Charlie Brown's Christmas Tales (2002)
I Want a Dog for Christmas, Charlie Brown (2003)